The third season of The Real Housewives of Orange County, an American reality television series, was broadcast on Bravo. It aired from November 6, 2007 until January 29, 2008, and was primarily filmed in Orange County, California. Its executive producers are Adam Karpel, Alex Baskin, Douglas Ross, Gregory Stewart, Scott Dunlop, Stephanie Boyriven and Andy Cohen.

The Real Housewives of Orange County focuses on the lives of Vicki Gunvalson, Jeana Keough, Lauri Waring, Tammy Knickerbocker, Tamra Barney, and Quinn Fry. It consisted of 12 episodes, all of which aired on Tuesday evenings.

Production and crew
The season premiere "Behind The Orange Curtain" was aired on November 6, 2007, while the eleventh episode "Here Comes The Bride" served as the season finale, and was aired on January 22, 2008. It was followed by a reunion special that aired on January 29, 2008, which marked the conclusion of the season. Adam Karpel, Alex Baskin, Douglas Ross, Gregory Stewart, Scott Dunlop, Stephanie Boyriven and Andy Cohen are recognized as the series' executive producers; it is produced and distributed by Evolution Media.

Cast and synopsis
Four of the five housewives featured on the second season of The Real Housewives of Orange County returned for the third installment. Jo De La Rosa departed the series; after breaking up with Slade Smiley, De La Rosa moved to Los Angeles to pursue a singing career. Two new housewives filled De La Rosa's place, spitfire Tamra Barney and devout Christian Quinn Fry. 

Barney tries easing the tension between her adult son Ryan and her husband Simon, after the former moves back into the family home. Barney approaches turning 40 and will try anything to stay young, which includes botox, clubbing and riding on the back of a Harley Davidson. Fry made her mid-season debut on the series during the sixth episode "The Boys of Summer", on December 11, 2007. Fry, a devout Christian balances faith and her love for younger men. Through the rest of the season Quinn juggles two younger men that she is dating, Billy and Jared. Vicki Gunvalson's struggle from last season continues as she experiences difficulty accepting her children Michael and Briana's independence as young adults, and sees her relationship with her husband Donn suffer from her commitment to expanding her insurance company. Tension between Gunvalson and Jeana Keough arise, as Gunvalson rents out her property through Keough. Keough's kids continue to grow as  Shane leaves to play minor league baseball in Canada, Colton becomes more like his brother, and Kara graduates highschool. Keough has had enough of her husband's resistance and lack of parenting and files for separation from Matt. Tammy Knickerbocker and her daughters deal with the sudden death of Knickerbocker's ex-husband Lou, who is also her daughter's father. With the death her ex-husband, Knickerbocker's daughter begin to lash out and party too much. Waring continues to celebrate her engagement and plans her wedding to George Peterson. Lauri marries George with her son's attendance, and is now known as Lauri Peterson.

Episodes

References

External links

 
 
 
 

2007 American television seasons
2008 American television seasons
Orange County (season 3)